The Gumma Film Awards (Amharic: ጉማ የፊልም ሽልማት) is an Ethiopian domestic film award held in Addis Ababa annually since 2014. Created by film director Yonas Berhene Mewa, the award programme broadcast through some television stations. Gumma rewards acclaimed domestic  Ethiopian films.

Overview
The Gumma Film Awards was created by director Yonas Berhene Mewa, the founder and owner of Ethio Films Production, believing to promote Ethiopian culture  within the film industry in 2014. According to organizers, Gumma would envisaged to bring Ethiopian film industry into world standard. Gumma presents reward for best cinema achievements in Ethiopian film industry and determined by professionals.

Notable events 
On 17 February 2012, 23 movies made so far nominated in 17 different categories. 

Note: numbers in bracket "()" denote how many times that they nominated. Source from Etmdb.

1st Gumma Award 
 Best Film of the Year: Zemen
 Best Actress Hana Yohannes

3rd Gumma Award
 Best Film of the Year: Keletat and Yewededu Semon
 Best Actors: Etsehiwot Abebe and Adisalem Getaneh

4th Gumma Award
 Best Film of the Year: Herol, Meba, Utopia, Wefe Komech, Yenegen Alwedim, and Yimechesh Yarada Lij 2
 Best Actors: Kidist Yilma (2) and Eyob Dawit

5th Gumma Award
 Best Film of the Year: Atse Mandela, Taza (5), Toxidow, Yabedech Yarada Lij 3 and Ye'egzier Dildey
 Best Actors: Amanuel Habtamu, Kidist Yilma, Zeritu Kebede (2), Mulualem Tadesse, Selam Tesfaye and Tseganesh Hailu

8th Gumma Award
In 8th Gumma Film Award edition, Mensur Jamal, Beshatu Tolemariam, Hana Yohannes, Meseret Mebrate, Girum Ermias and Saron Ayelign presented as special guests. Sayat Demissie expected to attend but withdrew earlier before the programme commenced.

References

Ethiopian film awards
Film festivals established in 2014